Nikolay Davydenko defeated Rafael Nadal in the final, 7–6(7–3), 6–3 to win the inaugural singles tennis title at the 2009 Shanghai Masters.

Seeds
The top eight seeds receive a bye into the second round.

Draw

Finals

Top half

Section 1

Section 2

Bottom half

Section 3

Section 4

Qualifying rounds

Seeds

Qualifiers

Qualifying draw

First qualifier

Second qualifier

Third qualifier

Fourth qualifier

Fifth qualifier

Sixth qualifier

Seventh qualifier

External links
 Main Draw Singles
 Qualifying Draw

Shanghai ATP Masters 1000 - Singles
2009 Shanghai ATP Masters 1000